Zainab Mohammed is an Emirati businessperson, CEO of property management and marketing at Dubai property developer Wasl.

She was ranked 10th most powerful Arab woman in 2015 by CEO Middle East.

References

External links

Arab Woman Platform Interview

Year of birth missing (living people)
Living people
Emirati women in business
Businesspeople from Dubai